Margaret "Peggy" R. Rotundo (born July 16, 1949) is an American politician from Maine. Rotundo served as a Democratic member of the Maine House of Representatives, representing District 74, which included part of Lewiston, from 2008 until 2016. From 2000 to 2008, she represented Lewiston in the Maine Senate. In 2006 she was named Senate Chair of the Maine Joint Committee on Appropriations and Financial Affairs. Supporters have regularly praised Rotundo for her commitment to bipartisanship and her advocacy for Maine people, particularly veterans, children, the elderly, immigrants and working mothers. In February 2016, Rotundo announced she would not run for Maine Senate. She was unable to seek re-election to the Maine House of Representatives due to term-limits.

Rotundo served as an at-large member of the Lewiston School Committee from 1994 to 2002, including four years as Chair of the School Committee (1998–2002).

Rotundo was born in Schenectady, New York and graduated from Mount Holyoke College in 1971. She has worked in the Bates College administration since 1978. Rotundo had previously worked from 1976 to 1978 as development director at the Abington Friends School in Pennsylvania.

References

1949 births
Living people
Bates College people
Democratic Party Maine state senators
Democratic Party members of the Maine House of Representatives
Mount Holyoke College alumni
Politicians from Lewiston, Maine
Politicians from Schenectady, New York
School board members in Maine
Women state legislators in Maine
21st-century American politicians
21st-century American women politicians